= Caulston =

Caulston Farm

Caulston is a settlement in the English county of Devon.

== Etymology ==
The name of Caulston is first attested in 1238, in the forms Calsinton and Calsintone. The name is thought to derive from an Old English personal name Cal(u)sige, compounded with the noun tūn ("farm, estate"). If so, the name once meant "Cal(u)sige's farm".
